Gail Thompson Kubik (September 5, 1914, South Coffeyville, Oklahoma – July 20, 1984, Covina, California) was an American composer, music director, violinist, and teacher.

Early life, education, and career
Kubik was born to Henry and Evelyn O. Kubik.  He studied at the Eastman School of Music, the American Conservatory of Music in Chicago with Leo Sowerby, and Harvard University with Walter Piston and Nadia Boulanger. He taught violin and composition at Monmouth College and composition and music history at Columbia University (1937), Teachers College and Scripps College.

Joining NBC Radio as staff composer in New York in 1940, he was music director for the Motion Picture Bureau at the Office of War Information, where, during World War II, he composed and conducted the music scores of motion pictures. He won the 1952 Pulitzer Prize for Music for Symphony Concertante.

He was a National Patron of Delta Omicron, an international professional music fraternity.

Works 
 American Caprice for piano and orchestra (1933 ; orch. 1936)
 Piano Trio (1934)
 Violin Concerto, Op. 4 (1934/36, dedicated to Jascha Heifetz)
 Violin Concerto No. 2 (1940/41, dedicated to Ruggiero Ricci)
 Suite for 3 recorders (1941)
 Sonatina for Piano (dedicated to Walter Piston) (1941)
 Symphony No. 1 in E-flat major (1946)
 Sonata for piano (1947)
 Celebrations And Epilogue, 10 short pieces for piano (1938-50)
 Symphony Concertante for piano, viola, trumpet and orchestra (1952)
 Symphony No. 2 in F major (1954-6)
 Symphony No. 3 (1956)
 Divertimento No. 1 for thirteen players (1959)
 Divertimento No. 2 for eight players (1959)
 Sonatina for clarinet and piano (dedicated to Nadia Boulanger) (1959)
 String Quartet (1960)
 In Praise of Johnny Appleseed (for bass, chorus, and orchestra), based on the Vachel Lindsay poem, entered into the 1942 National Federation of Music Clubs' choral composition contest. (Kettering won this contest with a work based on a Vachel Lindsay Johnny Appleseed poem)
 Symphony for 2 pianos (reworked from Symphony No. 1) (1949-79)
 Prayer and Toccata for 2 pianos and organ (1969-79)

Opera 
 Boston Baked Beans (1952)
 A Mirror for the Sky (a folk opera, first performed 1957)

Film scores 
 Men and Ships (1940)
 Colleges at War (1942)
 Menpower (1942)
 Paratroops (1942)
 The World at War (1942)
 Dover (1942, aka Dover Front Line)
 Earthquakers (1943)
 Air Pattern-Pacific (1944)
 The Memphis Belle (1944)
 Thunderbolt! (1947)
 C-Man (1949)
 Gerald McBoing-Boing (1950 cartoon based on a story by Dr. Seuss); Kubik composed also a longer version which is sometimes performed as a narrated concert piece with Dr. Seuss's text
 The Miner's Daughter (1950)
 Two Gals and a Guy (1951, aka Baby and Me) (incidental music, also served as musical director)
 The Desperate Hours (1955). Additional music by Daniele Amfitheatrof (uncredited)
 I Thank a Fool (1962) This score was later replaced by Ron Goodwin
 Music for Bells

References

External links
 
 Kubik papers at Kansas State University 
 NY Times obituary

1914 births
1984 deaths
American male classical composers
American classical composers
Columbia University faculty
Eastman School of Music alumni
Harvard University alumni
Pulitzer Prize for Music winners
20th-century classical composers
People from Nowata County, Oklahoma
People of the United States Office of War Information
Mannes School of Music alumni
Pupils of Walter Piston
American Conservatory of Music alumni
American film score composers
American male film score composers
20th-century American composers
20th-century American male musicians